Michael Laub (born 1953, in Belgium) is an avant-garde stage director and contemporary dance choreographer. His work has notably been shown at the Venice Biennale of 1984, the Festival d'Avignon of 2005, the Burgtheater in 2011, and several times at ImPulsTanz Vienna International Dance Festival and Hebbel am Ufer (HAU) Berlin. He has often been described as a minimalist and "one of the founding fathers of anti-illusionist theater".

Career

Laub's career began in the mid-1970s when based in Stockholm, founding and co-directing Maniac Productions with Edmundo Za. Their work was referred to as innovative; mixing Performance art and Video installation.  Genevieve van Cauwenberge observed that the performances "are in fact polyvalent and difficult to classify. They make use of everything at once, combining their specific language, stage direction, plastic arts (Minimal Art), musical composition (repetitive sampling) body language (Body Art), Happening (intervention of hazard) and of course the electronic video image."

With the founding of Remote Control Productions in 1981, Michael Laub proceeded to take his work somewhat closer to theater. Influenced by various forms, ranging from soap operas to classic literature and dance, his output as director of Remote Control Productions currently stands at over thirty plays. In what is perhaps something of an oversimplification of his extensive body of work, one can divide the material by three thematic approaches; the musical (Rough, Solo, Daniel and the Dancers, Total Masala Slammer); classic literature (Frank Wedekind's Lulu, Frankula, The Hans Christian Andersen Project); and portrait work (Portraits 360 Seconds, Out of Sorts, Alone/Gregoire, and The Biography Remix with Marina Abramović).  One constant, since Rewind Song in 1989, has been the collaboration between Remote Control Productions and musician Larry Steinbachek, formerly of the band Bronski Beat.

Many theater critics have noted the conventions-challenging nature of Laub's work.  When reviewing Daniel and the Dancers one writer commented that "the theatrical illusion has been destroyed, and what is happening on stage is simply a new reality." Deconstructing theater, finding novel ways in which to reconfigure the elements of a performance, is what fascinates and distinguishes this artist.  A review pertaining to the same piece in the Danish newspaper Politiken attributes a certain violence to this theatrical approach.  "This is masterful comedy," writes Monna Dithmer, "-served by the Laub diva Charlotte Engelkes-and a masterclass in the Laub technique, the aim of which is to smash the whole theatre process into bits and pieces and display them in all their naked glory."

It was only in the mid nineties, and in particular with the success of the play Rough, that Michael Laub/Remote Control Productions garnered international recognition.  As a result, the ensuing works became more elaborate in scope and far-reaching in audience.  An example of this was Laub's play Total Masala Slammer/Heartbreak No. 5 (2001), in which six months of research in India brought his fascination with Bollywood, Kathak dance and music into a synthesis with Goethe and Western contemporary live art forms.  The H.C. Andersen Project (2003) was another ambitious project that used a multitude of biographical and literary interpretations in exploring Laub's take on the famous Danish subject. The Austrian daily Der Standard lauded the resulting mash-up, stating the play's "masterful blend of condensed fairytales, biographical notes, and exquisitely transfigured personae from Andersen’s universe is achieved through clarity of dramatic structure, the lightness of the 'show' form, the outstanding dancers and performers, and the subtle music of Larry Steinbachek".

Between the large-scale productions of Total Masala Slammer and The H.C. Andersen Project, Laub directed Portraits 360 Sek at Hamburg's Deutsches Schauspielhaus in 2002 which was commissioned by Tom Stromberg. This was an undertaking which would spur his long-standing fascination with the applications of portraiture in theater to evolve.  Having experienced success with solo portraits (Solo with Charlotte Engelkes, and Out of Sorts with Richard Crane), Laub began, with Portraits 360 Sek to extend the idea to a collective performance, and in time, a serialized concept.

For the Laub portrait of the performance artist Marina Abramović in The Biography Remix (2004-'05), content called for a multi-layered format; "One moment you are watching the young Abramović on video, the next Abramović played by one of her young students, then Abramović in the flesh", but the object remained grounded in a very direct approach. While one critic noted that "above all one remembers authentic emotion, which culminated in the final glimpse of a smile from the artist. It is beautiful, very beautiful; terribly intimate; and perfectly universal." Libération concluded that "The Remix is generally as disturbing as it is moving". A quality one would anticipate, even aspire to, in a performance chronicling the life and work of an artist who has spent decades pushing the boundaries of physical and emotional endurance.

360 Sek and the ensuing Portrait Series projects (there have been five to date) eschew almost all theatrics and strip the performer's role down to often uncomfortably intimate biographical details. "By linking the unstructured with the well-calculated, the director subtly conveys to the audience some idea of those elements of which theatre is composed: exuberance and effort, yearning and application, happiness and fear. Yet because the individual portraits are so direct, as an exercise in vanity this self-portraiture remains modest. The quietly non-intentional gets the same six short minutes as the noisily exhibitionist, and that is why, in the final resort, the theatre emerges victorious as a powerhouse of the imagination as opposed to a factory of personalities." The focus is on realism and authenticity.  This is made all the more evident with Laub often favoring non-professionals for these projects, as their untrained stage personae are all the more vulnerable and raw.

The Portrait Series have proven popular, in part due to the concept's adaptability. From a theoretical point of view, The Portrait Series is an endeavor wherein he tests theater's global vocabulary.  The idea being that virtually any entity comprising interesting characters can be formatted by Laub for a Portrait Series show.

He opened 2010 with the highly personal, original composition Death, Dance and some Talk in Berlin (February), followed by Portrait Series Istanbul (April–May), Portrait Series Rotterdam (September), and commencing work on the Burgporträts at the Burgtheater, Vienna.

After opening the Burgporträts (March) in 2011, Michael Laub's attentions shifted to the emerging arts scene in Cambodia.  For the past five years he has embarked on a series of projects exploring traditional and contemporary Cambodian artistic expression.  The Portrait Series Battambang began in 2012 in conjunction with Phare Ponleu Selpak, and culminated in the Galaxy Khmer tour collaboration with the rock band Cambodian Space Project, bringing these distinct voices to Europe two years later.

2016 began with the opening of the solo performance  Asutorito Endoruwaito (January) in Berlin's Hebbel am Ufer, which was followed by Dance Portraits - Cambodia opening at ImPulsTanz Vienna International Dance Festival and the Weltmuseum Wien (February).

In 2017, the world premier of Fassbinder, Faust and the Animists was shown at Hebbel am Ufer (HAU) Berlin and opened the ImPulsTanz Festival in Vienna the same year. In the piece „Laub slaves away at Fassbinder’s cult film Beware of a Holy Whore with his sensational 17-strong ensemble on an empty white video-wall stage. But also at Goethe’s Faust, at animism – that is the idea that nature is ensouled – at the Madison dance so popular in the 1950s and 60s. The result is a virtuosic and impressive interconnection of film, theatre, dance, literature, comic, manga, yoga and an excessive display of costumes.“

With his latest work Rolling Laub continued the disposition of intertwining film and theater on stage and conceived a play that was entirely composed out of over 200 film excerpts staged in a roughly two-hour piece. In 2019, it premiered at Hebbel am Ufer (HAU) Berlin and toured ImPulsTanz Festival in Vienna the same year.

Michael Laub is founder and artistic director of the artist in residency programme The Umbrellas of Phnom Penh (TUOPP). From 2017-18 TUOPP was a unique structure in Phnom Penh that accommodated residencies for international artists and local creatives from different fields of practice including visual artists, video/film makers, dancers, choreographers, sound artists and designers.
In addition to his stage-work, Laub has held several guest professorships (at the University of Giessen, the Free University Berlin, the Norwegian Theatre Academy), as well as a residency at HfG Karlsruhe in 2011. In 2020 he held the Valeska Gert Guestprofessorship at Free University Berlin’s MA Dance Sciences for a second time after teaching there in 2006/07.

In 2021 he publishes Rewind Song, a book in which he remixes images and text from past works in a non-chronological order.

Works

Maniac Productions
1975Maniac Productions, Narren Teater, Stockholm
1976Enfantillage, Fylkingen Center for Intermedia, StockholmParalysed Infancy in Repetitive Structure, De Appel, Amsterdam
Avant Tehran, De Appel, Amsterdam
1977Mouse in Repetitive Structure, Avant Tehran Mickery Theatre, AmsterdamLily is going to have a baby, Fylkingen Center for Intermedia, StockholmInfection/Love Tape I, Video Festival, Fylkingen, Stockholm
1978Tragico Intervallo, Kunstakademie, DüsseldorfTragico Intervallo II, Arteferia Post Avant-Garde Theater Festival, BolognaManiac Productions II, Mickery, AmsterdamI closed the window and I went out for dinner, Folkwang Museum, Essen/Galerie Neu, AachenHotel Life (a 12-hour live video exhibition in 12 hotel rooms), Museumzicht Hotel, AmsterdamUntitled Video Performance, International Performance Festival, Beursschouwburg, Brussels
1979 Dinner Somewhere and then Back to my room RTBF Television, Kolnischer Kunstverein, Cologne/Theatre Populaire de Wallonie, LiegChap Tapes I, Internationaal Cultureel Centrum, Antwerp
1980Chap Tapes II, Mickery, Amsterdam

Remote Control Productions
1981Snapping, Computing and PerformingKulturhuset, Stockholm
1982White OutModerna Museet, Stockholm
1984Return of SensationXXXII Biennale di Venezia Kulturhuset, StockholmInternational Theatre Festival, Copenhagen, June 1985
1987PressureKulturhuset, Stockholm
1989Rewind SongModerna Museet, Stockholm, February6th Bergen International Theatre Festival, Norway
1991Fast Forward/ Bad Air und so...Dansens Hus, Stockholm, FebruaryTheater am Turm, Frankfurt, FebruaryBergen International Theatre, AprilTouch Time Festival, Mickery, Amsterdam, MayKaaitheater, Brussels, JuneWiener Festwochen, Vienna, June
1992Jack's Travelogue/La Prison des FemmesBlack Box Theatre, Oslo, MayTeatro Central, Seville Expo '92, JuneDansens Hus, Stockholm, AugustTheater am Turm, Frankfurt, OctoberKaaitheater/Theatre 140, Brussels, November
1994RoughKulturhuset, Stockholm, JanuaryTeatergarasjen, Bergen, JanuarySpringdance, Utrecht, AprilTheater am Turm, Frankfurt, AprilSzene, Salzburg, JulyInternationales Sommer Theater Festival, Hamburg, JulyTheatre 140/ Charleroi Danse, Brussels, NovemberNordisk Scenekunst Festival, Arhus, AprilEuropaisches Festival Schlossfestspiele, Schwerin, JuneLudwigsburg Schlossfestspiele, JulyHebbel Theater, Berlin, August
1994-'96Daniel and the DancersFrascati, Amsterdam, October, 1994Monty, Antwerpen, January, 1995Lantaren, Rotterdam, January, 1995Schouwburg, Tilburg, January, 1995Dansens Hus, Stockholm, February, 1995Theater am Turm, Frankfurt, February, 1996Hebbel Theater, Berlin, March 1996Kanon Hallen, Copenhagen, March 1996
1995-'96Solo with Charlotte EngelkesSpielart, Munich, October 1995Theater am Turm, Frankfurt, February 1996Hebbel Theater, Berlin, May 1996Szene, Salzburg, July 1996Monty, Antwerp, October 1996Schouwburg, Tilburg, October 1996Kulturhuset Arhus, November 1996
1997-'98Planet LuluKulturhus Arhus, March 1997Springdance, Utrecht, April 1997Theater am Turm, Frankfurt, May 1997Hebbel Theater, Berlin, May 1997Szene, Salzburg, July 1997Zürcher Theater Spektakel, Zurich, September 1997Kampnagel, Hamburg, September 1997Grand Theater, Groningen, September 1997De Brakke Grond, Amsterdam, October 1997Schouwburg, Tilburg, October 1997Pusterviksteatern, Gotheborg, October 1998Dansens Hus, Stockholm, October 1998
1998-'99FrankulaGrand Theatre, Groningen, August 1998TANZtheaterInternational, Hanover, September 1998Frascati, Amsterdam, September 1998Schouwburg, Tilburg, February 1999Hebbel Theater, February/March 1999Szene, Salzburg, July 1999
1999-2000Out of SortsDe Brakke Grond, Amsterdam, April 1999Grand Theatre, Groningen, April 1999Szene, Salzburg, July 1999Expo, Hanover, September 1999Schouwburg, Tilburg, October 1999Mousonturm, Frankfurt, February 2000
2000-'03Pigg in HellTanz im August, Berlin, 2000Podewil, Berlin, 2001Mousonturm, Frankfurt, 2001off limits Festival, Dortmund, 2001Rotterdamse Schouwburg, 2001euro-scene, Leipzig, 2001Tramway, Glasgow, 2002Impulstanz, Vienna, 2002Tanzwerkstatt, Munich, 2002Zürcher Theater Spektakel, Zurich, 2002Four Days in Motion, 6th International Theater Festival, Prague, 2002cutting edge, Staatstheater Darmstadt, 2003
2001-'02Total Masala Slammer/Heartbreak No. 5Tanz im August, Hebbel-Theater, Berlin, 2001Archa Theater, Prague, 2001Zürcher Theater Spektakel, Zurich, 2001Rotterdamse Schouwburg, 2001Szene, Salzburg, 2002Impulstanz, Vienna, 2002Melbourne Festival, 2002
2002Portraits 360 SekDeutsches Schauspielhaus(German) Hamburg, 2002
2003The H.C. Andersen Project- Tales and CostumesZürcher Theater Spektakel, Zurich, 2003Hebbel Theater, Berlin, 2003Rotterdamse Schouwburg, 2003Exodus Festival, Cankargev Dom, Ljubljana, 2004Dance, Munich, 2004Mousonturm, Frankfurt, 2005Rencontre Choreographique de Seine St. Denis, 2005
2004-'05The Biography Remix with Marina AbramovićRomaeuropa, Rome, 2004Festival d'Avignon, 2005
2004AloneZürcher Theater Spektakel, Zurich
2004-'09Portrait Series: Alone/Gregoire Deutsches Schauspielhaus(German) Hamburg, 2004De Internationale Keuze van de Rotterdamse Schouwburg, Rotterdam, 2004Tanz im August, Internationales Tanzfest Berlin, 2005Tanzquartier, Vienna, 2005Mousonturm, Frankfurt, 2006Rencontre Choreographique de Seine St. Denis, 2006Festival d'Otono, Madrid, 2007Sommer Szene, Salzburg, 8–9 July 2009
2007–presentPortrait Series Berlin. Professional and Non-Professional Dancers/Marching Series (work in progress)Tanz im August, Internationales Tanzfest Berlin, 2007Zürcher Theater Spektakel, Zurich, 2007Rotterdamse Schouwburg, 2007
2008Bruce and MoreHeli Meklin & Michael Laub Moving in November Festival, Kiasma Museum, Helsinki, November
2010Death, Dance and Some TalkSophiensaele, Berlin, 23–27 February
Portrait Series Istanbul: Aspiring Actresses, and Actresses.Garajistanbul, 28–30 April, 6 –8 MayKulturhauptstadt Europas RUHR.Favoriten, Essen, 26–28 November
Portrait Series RotterdamLantern/Venster (Schouwburg Internationale Keuze Festival), 15–19 September
2011Portrait Series/Burgportäts Burgtheater, Vienna
2012Portrait Series BattambangPhare Ponleu Selpak, Battambang, Cambodia. 
2014Galaxy Khmer / Portrait Series Battambang16-18 January HAU Hebbel am Ufer, Berlin23-24 January
BIT Teatergarasjen, Bergen
2016Asturito EndoruwaitoHAU Hebbel am Ufer, Berlin
Dance Portraits - CambodiaImPulsTanz Festival ViennaWeltmuseum Wien
2017Fassbinder, Faust and the AnimistsHAU Hebbel am Ufer BerlinImPulsTanz Festival Vienna
2019RollingHAU Hebbel am Ufer BerlinImPulsTanz Festival Vienna

Literature 

 Michael Laub, Miriam Schmidtke (Ed.): Rewind Song. Tartin Editionen, Salzburg 2021, ISBN 978-3902163707.

References

External links
 Website of Michael Laub's Remote Control Productions (http://www.michael-laub.com)
 Video of Total Masala Slammer/Heartbreak No. 5 (http://www.impulstanz.com/gallery/videos/rmf9/
 Vimeo Page http://vimeo.com/michaellaub

1953 births
Living people
Belgian choreographers
Belgian theatre directors